Edirisinghe Mudiyanselage "E. M." Senanayake (born February 14, 1970 in Kandy) is a Sri Lankan sport shooter. At age thirty-eight, Senanayake made his official debut for the 2008 Summer Olympics in Beijing, where he competed in two pistol shooting events. He scored a total of 561 targets in the preliminary rounds of the men's 10 m air pistol, by two points behind Egypt's Mahmod Abdelaly, finishing only in forty-eighth place. Three days later, Senanayake placed thirty-sixth in his second event, 50 m pistol, by one point ahead of Czech Republic's Martin Tenk, with a total score of 545 targets.

References

External links
 
 
 NBC Olympics Profile

Sri Lankan male sport shooters
Living people
Olympic shooters of Sri Lanka
Shooters at the 2008 Summer Olympics
Sportspeople from Kandy
1970 births
Shooters at the 2006 Asian Games
Shooters at the 2010 Asian Games
Commonwealth Games competitors for Sri Lanka
Shooters at the 2014 Commonwealth Games
Asian Games competitors for Sri Lanka
20th-century Sri Lankan people
21st-century Sri Lankan people